Les Landau is an American television director, film director and film producer. He is best known for his work on the Star Trek franchise from 1987 to 2002, having worked on four Star Trek shows: The Next Generation, Deep Space Nine, Voyager and Enterprise. His work on Enterprise was Landau's final professional work.

Early life
Les Landau is one of five children born to television and film producer Ely Landau and his wife, Edythe Rein. His family is of Jewish background.

Directing work
Landau's earliest credit was as production assistant on the 1973 film The Iceman Cometh, produced by his father, Ely Landau. By 1976 he was serving as assistant director, on the film Leadbelly, starring Madge Sinclair and Albert Hall, and as first assistant director on the television series Dynasty and T.J. Hooker.

He has also directed episodes for such television series as Beverly Hills, 90210, seaQuest DSV, Lois & Clark: The New Adventures of Superman, M.A.N.T.I.S., Sliders, JAG, and Dark Angel.

Actor Garret Wang remembers Les Landau directing them for the Star Trek: Voyager episode "The Chute", and while he was trying to focus on acting, the other actors in the series were around Landau making a ruckus. The reason was they had just started having actors direct in that television series, and his co-star McNeil had just directed the previous episode; that was his first time directing and other actors were excited about getting into directing.

He produced and directed the 1998 film Archibald the Rainbow Painter, a fictional work about Vietnam veterans, written by Laura Landau.

Star Trek credits

The Next Generation
 "Code of Honor" (Uncredited, replaced Russ Mayberry during production)
 "The Arsenal of Freedom"
 "The Schizoid Man"
 "Samaritan Snare"
 "The Survivors"
 "Deja Q"
 "Sins of the Father"
 "Sarek"
 "Family"
 "Future Imperfect"
 "Clues"
 "Night Terrors"
 "Half a Life"
 "Ensign Ro"
 "Unification I"
 "Conundrum"
 "Time's Arrow, Part I"
 "Time's Arrow, Part II"
 "Chain of Command, Part II"
 "Tapestry"
 "Dark Page"

Deep Space Nine
 "Progress"
 "The Forsaken"
 "Invasive Procedures"
 "Sanctuary"
 "Whispers"
 "The House of Quark"
 "Second Skin"
 "Destiny"
 "Crossfire"
 "Accession"
 "Broken Link"
 "By Inferno's Light"
 "Image in the Sand"
 "Afterimage"

Voyager
 "Time and Again"
 "Prime Factors"
 "Heroes and Demons"
 "Alliances"
 "Investigations"
 "The Chute"
 "Drone"
 "Virtuoso"
 "Counterpoint"

Enterprise
 "Sleeping Dogs"

References

External links
 

American film directors
American film producers
American television directors
Living people
Year of birth missing (living people)
Place of birth missing (living people)